Bohórquez is a surname. Notable people with the surname include:

 Abigael Bohórquez (born 1932), Mexican playwright
 Argemiro Bohórquez (born 1960), Colombian cyclist
 Edith, Merylin and Mercedes Bohorquez, founders of the French women's football team now known as GPSO 92 Issy
 Hernando Bohórquez (born 1992), Colombian cyclist
 José Álvarez de Bohórquez (1897–1993), Spanish horse rider
 Juan Bartolomé de Bohorquez e Hinojosa (1542–1633), Roman Catholic prelate
 Juan Lozano Bohórquez (born 1955), Spanish footballer
 Luis Fernando Bohórquez, Colombian actor
 Pedro Bohórquez (1602–1667), Spanish adventurer
 María de Bohórquez (1539–1559), Spanish Protestant martyr